Omar Abdullah Al-Dahi (born on 15 December 1999), is a Yemeni professional football player who plays for Egyptian club Aswan and the Yemeni national team.

Club career
Al-Dahi started his career playing for Al-Sha'ab Sana'a, he later joined Iraqi club Al-Qasim. In November 2020, he transferred to Egyptian club Aswan.

International career
He debuted internationally on 8 August 2019, in the 2019 WAFF Championship held in Iraq with a match against Lebanon in a 2–1 victory.

On 5 September 2019, Al-Dahi appeared in the 2022 FIFA World Cup qualification to be held in Qatar and scored his first goal for Yemen against Saudi Arabia in a 2–2 draw.

International goals
Scores and results list Yemen's goal tally first.

References

1999 births
Living people
Yemeni footballers
Yemen international footballers
Association football midfielders
Yemeni expatriate footballers
Yemeni expatriate sportspeople in Iraq
Yemeni expatriate sportspeople in Egypt
Expatriate footballers in Iraq
Expatriate footballers in Egypt
Aswan SC players
Al-Qasim SC players